Gazzola is a surname. Notable people with the surname include:

Alessia Gazzola (born 1982), Italian novelist
John Mario Gazzola (born 1957), Australian politician
Marcello Gazzola (born 1985), Italian footballer 
Randy Gazzola (born 1993), Canadian ice hockey player